Santotomasia is a monotypic genus of flowering plants belonging to the family Orchidaceae. The only species is Santotomasia wardiana.

Its native range is Philippines.

References

Aeridinae
Monotypic orchid genera